Children of Chance may refer to:

 Children of Chance (1930 film), a British crime film
 Children of Chance (1949 film), a British drama film